HMS Nabbington, was a Royal Navy, Mobile Naval Operating Air Base (MONAB), that was established at the Royal Australian Air Force (RAAF) base RAAF Nowra at Nowra, New South Wales, in Australia during the final stages of the Second World War. HMS Nabbington was also known as MONAB I and Royal Naval Air Station (RNAS) Nowra.

History 
After being assembled at Royal Naval Air Station (RNAS) Ludham on 4 September 1944, the base was commissioned as an independent command bearing the ship's name HMS Nabbington on 28 October 1944. Established to support the aircraft carriers of the British Pacific Fleet, the base's stores, equipment and vehicles sailed from Victoria Dock, Birkenhead, aboard the S.S. Suffolk, and personnel sailed from Gladstone Dock, Liverpool upon S.S. Empress of Scotland on 20 November 1944 bound for Sydney, Australia.

After arriving in Sydney on 20 December 1944, the personnel set up at Warwick Farm racecourse, which had been converted into Camp Warwick, a part of HMS Golden Hind, the Royal Navy barracks in Sydney. Upon Suffolks arrival at Sydney on 24 December 1944, Royal Australian Air Force personnel from No. 1 Transportation & Movements began unloading the stores and equipment for transport to RAAF Nowra, which was officially transferred to the Royal Navy on a loan basis and commissioned as HMS Nabbington, Royal Naval Air Station Nowra, on 2 January 1945. Some improvements and expansion were required in order to make the base operational, and these were undertaken during January 1945.

After these improvements were completed, the base provided shore based facilities for the British Pacific Fleet's Carrier Air Groups when the carriers were in Sydney for repairs and resupply. In early March 1945 operational flying was transferred to Nowra's satellite airfield at Jervis Bay Airfield in order to permit emergency repairs to be carried out on the runways and taxiways at Nowra which were deteriorating due to wet weather and heavy use. Flying operations returned to Nowra on 28 April 1945. On 18 May 1945, No. 3 Carrier Air Group was formed as a reserve Air Group.

When the Japanese surrendered on 15 August 1945, Victory over Japan Day (VJ Day) or Victory in the Pacific (VP Day), was celebrated at Nowra and the men and women of HMS Nabbington marched through the streets. Nabbington, MONAB I, was paid off on 15 November 1945 and RNAS Nowra was subsequently re-commissioned as HMS Nabwick (MONAB V) on 15 November 1945.

Commanding officers
 Commander. G. A. Nunneley – 28 October 1944
 Captain H. G. Dickinson – 9 March 1945
 Captain J. D Harvey – 1 May 1945

Units based at HMS Nabbington
 723 Fleet Requirements Unit (27 February – 7 March 1945) & (4 June – 15 November 1945)
 706 Pool & Refresher Flying Training Squadron (24 October 1945)
 Mobile Maintenance 1
 Maintenance Servicing 1& 2
 Mobile Repair 1
 Maintenance, Storage & Resave 1 & 2
 Mobile Air Torpedo Maintenance Units 3. 6 & 7

Squadrons based at HMS Nabbington 

 820 Squadron  (10 – 27 February 1945) & (18 September 1945) (Avenger IIs)
 828 Squadron  (24 August 1945) (Avengers)
 837 Squadron  (29 October 1945) (exchanged Barracudas for 12 Firefly FR.Is)
 848 Squadron  (24 August – 25 October 1945) (Avengers)
 849 Squadron  (10 – 27 February 1945) & (6 – 24 June 1945) (Avengers)
 854 Squadron  (11 February – 6 March 1945) & (18 May – 24 October 1945) (Avengers)
 857 Squadron  (11 – 28 February 1945), (5 June – 2 August 1945) & (11 – 22 October 1945) (Avengers)
 1771 Squadron (13 September – 16 October 1945) (Firefly Is)
 1830 Squadron  (9 February – 7 March 1945) (Corsairs)
 1833 Squadron  (9 February – 7 March 1945) (6 Corsairs)
 1834 Squadron  (10 – 27 February 1945) (Corsairs)
 1836 Squadron  (10 – 27 February 1945) (Corsairs)
 1839 Squadron  (11 – 27 February 1945), (1 June – 3 August 1945) & (10 – 22 October 1945) (Hellcats)
 1841 Squadron  (23 August – 25 October 1945) (Corsairs)
 1842 Squadron  (23 August – 25 October 1945) (Corsairs)
 1843 Squadron  (15 July 1945 – 24 October 1945) (Corsair IVs)
 1844 Squadron  (11 – 27 February 1945), (5 June – 3 August 1945), (11 – 16 August 1945) & (10 – 22 October 1945) (Hellcats)
 1845 Squadron  (14 July – 24 October 1945) (Corsair IVs) 
 1846 Squadron  (14 July – 13 August 1945) (Corsair IVs)

Aircraft carriers squadrons disembarked from/embarked to

 HMS Colossus
 HMS Formidable
 HMS Illustrious
 HMS Indefatigable
 HMS Indomitable
 HMS Implacable
 HMS Victorious

Satellite airfields
 Jervis Bay
 Vineyards

References

 

Military history of Sydney during World War II
Royal Naval Air Stations